The 87th Academy Awards ceremony, presented by the Academy of Motion Picture Arts and Sciences (AMPAS), honored the best films of 2014 and took place on February 22, 2015, at the Dolby Theatre in Hollywood, Los Angeles beginning at 5:30 p.m. PST / 8:30 p.m. EST. During the ceremony, AMPAS presented Academy Awards (commonly referred to as Oscars) in 24 categories. The ceremony was televised in the United States by ABC, produced by Neil Meron and Craig Zadan and directed by Hamish Hamilton. Actor Neil Patrick Harris hosted the ceremony for the first time.

In related events, the Academy held its 6th Annual Governors Awards ceremony at the Grand Ballroom of the Hollywood and Highland Center on November 8, 2014. On February 7, 2015, in a ceremony at the Beverly Wilshire Hotel in Beverly Hills, California, the Academy Awards for Technical Achievement were presented by hosts Margot Robbie and Miles Teller.

Birdman or (The Unexpected Virtue of Ignorance) won four awards, including Best Picture. Other winners included The Grand Budapest Hotel with four awards, Whiplash with three, and American Sniper, Big Hero 6, Boyhood, Citizenfour, Crisis Hotline: Veterans Press 1, Feast, Ida, The Imitation Game, Interstellar, The Phone Call, Selma, Still Alice, and The Theory of Everything with one. The telecast garnered more than 37 million viewers in the United States.

Winners and nominees 

The nominees for the 87th Academy Awards were announced on January 15, 2015, at 5:30 a.m. PST (13:30 UTC), at the Samuel Goldwyn Theater in Beverly Hills, California, by directors J. J. Abrams and Alfonso Cuarón, Academy president Cheryl Boone Isaacs and actor Chris Pine. For the first time, nominations for all 24 competitive categories were announced. Birdman or (The Unexpected Virtue of Ignorance) and The Grand Budapest Hotel tied for the most nominations with nine each.

The winners were announced during the awards ceremony on February 22, 2015. For the first time since the expansion of the Best Picture nominee roster at the 82nd ceremony in 2010, every Best Picture nominee won at least one award. Birdman was the first film to win Best Picture without an editing nomination since Ordinary People (1980). Alejandro G. Iñárritu became the second consecutive Mexican to win for Best Director after Cuarón who won for helming Gravity. At age 84, Robert Duvall was the oldest male acting nominee in Oscar history.
Having won for his work on Gravity the year before, Emmanuel Lubezki became the fourth person to win two consecutive Best Cinematography awards. John Toll was the last one who accomplished this feat for his work on 1994's Legends of the Fall and 1995's Braveheart.

Awards 

Winners are listed first, highlighted in boldface, and indicated with a double dagger.

{| class=wikitable
|-
| valign="top"|

 Birdman or (The Unexpected Virtue of Ignorance) – Alejandro G. Iñárritu, John Lesher, and James W. Skotchdopole American Sniper – Clint Eastwood, Robert Lorenz, Andrew Lazar, Bradley Cooper, and Peter Morgan
 Boyhood – Richard Linklater and Cathleen Sutherland
 The Grand Budapest Hotel – Wes Anderson, Scott Rudin, Steven Rales and Jeremy Dawson
 The Imitation Game – Nora Grossman, Ido Ostrowsky, and Teddy Schwarzman
 Selma – Christian Colson, Oprah Winfrey, Dede Gardner, and Jeremy Kleiner
 The Theory of Everything – Tim Bevan, Eric Fellner, Lisa Bruce, and Anthony McCarten
 Whiplash – Jason Blum, Helen Estabrook, and David Lancaster
| valign="top"|

 Alejandro G. Iñárritu – Birdman or (The Unexpected Virtue of Ignorance)
 Richard Linklater – Boyhood
 Bennett Miller – Foxcatcher
 Wes Anderson – The Grand Budapest Hotel
 Morten Tyldum – The Imitation Game
|-
| valign="top"|

 Eddie Redmayne – The Theory of Everything as Stephen Hawking
 Steve Carell – Foxcatcher as John Eleuthère du Pont
 Bradley Cooper – American Sniper as Chris Kyle
 Benedict Cumberbatch – The Imitation Game as Alan Turing
 Michael Keaton – Birdman or (The Unexpected Virtue of Ignorance) as Riggan Thomson
| valign="top"|

 Julianne Moore – Still Alice as Alice Howland
 Marion Cotillard – Two Days, One Night as Sandra Bya
 Felicity Jones – The Theory of Everything as Jane Wilde Hawking
 Rosamund Pike – Gone Girl as Amy Elliott-Dunne
 Reese Witherspoon – Wild as Cheryl Strayed
|-
| valign="top"|

 J. K. Simmons – Whiplash as Terence Fletcher
 Robert Duvall – The Judge as Judge Joseph Palmer
 Ethan Hawke – Boyhood as Mason Evans, Sr.
 Edward Norton – Birdman or (The Unexpected Virtue of Ignorance) as Mike Shiner
 Mark Ruffalo – Foxcatcher as Dave Schultz
| valign="top"|

 Patricia Arquette – Boyhood as Olivia Evans
 Laura Dern – Wild as Bobbi Grey
 Keira Knightley – The Imitation Game as Joan Clarke
 Emma Stone – Birdman or (The Unexpected Virtue of Ignorance) as Sam Thomson
 Meryl Streep – Into the Woods as The Witch
|-
| valign="top"|

 Birdman or (The Unexpected Virtue of Ignorance) – Alejandro G. Iñárritu, Nicolás Giacobone, Alexander Dinelaris Jr., and Armando Bo
 Boyhood – Richard Linklater
 Foxcatcher – E. Max Frye and Dan Futterman
 The Grand Budapest Hotel – Wes Anderson and Hugo Guinness
 Nightcrawler – Dan Gilroy
| valign="top"|

 The Imitation Game – Graham Moore;  American Sniper – Jason Hall; 
 Inherent Vice – Paul Thomas Anderson; 
 The Theory of Everything – Anthony McCarten; 
 Whiplash – Damien Chazelle; 
|-
| valign="top"|

 Big Hero 6 – Don Hall, Chris Williams, and Roy Conli The Boxtrolls – Anthony Stacchi, Graham Annable, and Travis Knight
 How to Train Your Dragon 2 – Dean DeBlois and Bonnie Arnold
 Song of the Sea – Tomm Moore and Paul Young
 The Tale of the Princess Kaguya – Isao Takahata and Yoshiaki Nishimura
| valign="top"|

 Ida (Poland) in Polish – Directed by Paweł Pawlikowski Leviathan (Russia) in Russian – Directed by Andrey Zvyagintsev
 Tangerines (Estonia) in Estonian and Russian – Directed by Zaza Urushadze
 Timbuktu (Mauritania) in French  – Directed by Abderrahmane Sissako
 Wild Tales (Argentina) in Spanish  – Directed by Damián Szifron
|-
| valign="top"|

 Citizenfour – Laura Poitras, Mathilde Bonnefoy, and Dirk Wilutzky Finding Vivian Maier – John Maloof and Charlie Siskel
 Last Days in Vietnam – Rory Kennedy and Keven McAlester
 The Salt of the Earth – Wim Wenders, Juliano Ribeiro Salgado and David Rosier
 Virunga – Orlando von Einsiedel and Joanna Natasegara
| valign="top"|

 Crisis Hotline: Veterans Press 1 – Ellen Goosenberg Kent and Dana Perry Joanna – Aneta Kopacz
 Our Curse – Tomasz Śliwiński and Maciej Ślesicki
 The Reaper – Gabriel Serra Arguello
 White Earth – J. Christian Jensen
|-
| valign="top"|

 The Phone Call – Mat Kirkby and James Lucas Aya – Oded Binnun and Mihal Brezis
 Boogaloo and Graham – Michael Lennox and Ronan Blaney
 Butter Lamp – Hu Wei and Julien Féret
 Parvaneh – Talkhon Hamzavi and Stefan Eichenberger
| valign="top"|

 Feast – Patrick Osborne and Kristina Reed The Bigger Picture – Daisy Jacobs and Christopher Hees
 The Dam Keeper – Robert Kondo and Daisuke Tsutsumi
 Me and My Moulton – Torill Kove
 A Single Life – Joris Oprins
|-
| valign="top"|

 The Grand Budapest Hotel – Alexandre Desplat The Imitation Game – Alexandre Desplat
 Interstellar – Hans Zimmer
 Mr. Turner – Gary Yershon
 The Theory of Everything – Jóhann Jóhannsson
| valign="top"|

 "Glory" from Selma – Music and Lyrics by John Stephens and Lonnie Lynn "Everything Is Awesome" from The Lego Movie – Music and Lyrics by Shawn Patterson
 "Grateful" from Beyond the Lights – Music and Lyrics by Diane Warren
 "I'm Not Gonna Miss You" from Glen Campbell: I'll Be Me – Music and Lyrics by Glen Campbell and Julian Raymond
 "Lost Stars" from Begin Again – Music and Lyrics by Gregg Alexander and Danielle Brisebois
|-
| valign="top"|

 American Sniper – Alan Robert Murray and Bub Asman Birdman or (The Unexpected Virtue of Ignorance) – Martin Hernández and Aaron Glascock
 The Hobbit: The Battle of the Five Armies – Brent Burge and Jason Canovas
 Interstellar – Richard King
 Unbroken – Becky Sullivan and Andrew DeCristofaro
| valign="top"|

 Whiplash – Craig Mann, Ben Wilkins, and Thomas Curley American Sniper – John T. Reitz, Gregg Rudloff, and Walt Martin (posthumous nomination)
 Birdman or (The Unexpected Virtue of Ignorance) – Jon Taylor, Frank A. Montaño, and Thomas Varga
 Interstellar – Gary A. Rizzo, Gregg Landaker, and Mark Weingarten
 Unbroken – Jon Taylor, Frank A. Montaño, and David Lee
|-
| valign="top"|

 The Grand Budapest Hotel – Production Design: Adam Stockhausen; Set Decoration: Anna Pinnock The Imitation Game – Production Design: Maria Djurkovic; Set Decoration: Tatiana Macdonald
 Interstellar – Production Design: Nathan Crowley; Set Decoration: Gary Fettis
 Into the Woods – Production Design: Dennis Gassner; Set Decoration: Anna Pinnock
 Mr. Turner – Production Design: Suzie Davies; Set Decoration: Charlotte Watts
| valign="top"|

 Birdman or (The Unexpected Virtue of Ignorance) – Emmanuel Lubezki The Grand Budapest Hotel – Robert Yeoman
 Ida – Łukasz Żal and Ryszard Lenczewski
 Mr. Turner – Dick Pope
 Unbroken – Roger Deakins
|-
| valign="top"|

 The Grand Budapest Hotel – Frances Hannon and Mark Coulier Foxcatcher – Bill Corso and Dennis Liddiard
 Guardians of the Galaxy – Elizabeth Yianni-Georgiou and David White
| valign="top"|

 The Grand Budapest Hotel – Milena Canonero Inherent Vice – Mark Bridges
 Into the Woods – Colleen Atwood
 Maleficent – Anna B. Sheppard
 Mr. Turner – Jacqueline Durran
|-
| valign="top"|

 Whiplash – Tom Cross American Sniper – Joel Cox and Gary D. Roach
 Boyhood – Sandra Adair
 The Grand Budapest Hotel – Barney Pilling
 The Imitation Game – William Goldenberg
| valign="top"|

 Interstellar'' – Paul Franklin, Andrew Lockley, Ian Hunter, and Scott Fisher
 Captain America: The Winter Soldier – Dan DeLeeuw, Russell Earl, Bryan Grill, and Dan Sudick
 Dawn of the Planet of the Apes – Joe Letteri, Dan Lemmon, Daniel Barrett, and Erik Winquist
 Guardians of the Galaxy – Stephane Ceretti, Nicolas Aithadi, Jonathan Fawkner, and Paul Corbould
 X-Men: Days of Future Past – Richard Stammers, Lou Pecora, Tim Crosbie, and Cameron Waldbauer
|}

 Governors Awards 
The Academy held its 6th Annual Governors Awards ceremony on November 8, 2014, during which the following awards were presented:

Honorary Academy Awards
 Jean-Claude Carrière  Whose elegantly crafted screenplays elevate the art of screenwriting to the level of literature.
 Hayao Miyazaki  A master storyteller whose animated artistry has inspired filmmakers and audiences around the world.
 Maureen O'Hara  One of Hollywood's brightest stars, whose inspiring performances glowed with passion, warmth and strength.

Jean Hersholt Humanitarian Award
 Harry Belafonte  For a lifetime of demonstrating how art is ennobled by ceaseless courage and conscience.

Films with multiple nominations and awards

The following 17 films received multiple nominations:

The following three films received multiple awards:

 Presenters and performers 
The following individuals, listed in order of appearance, presented awards or performed musical numbers.

 Presenters 

 Performers 

 Ceremony information 

Riding on the success of the previous year's ceremony which garnered its highest viewership figures in over a decade, the Academy rehired producers Neil Meron and Craig Zadan for the third consecutive year. “Their showmanship has elevated the show to new heights and we are excited to keep the momentum going with this creative partnership,” said AMPAS president Cheryl Boone Isaacs in a press release announcing the selection. In October 2014, actor Neil Patrick Harris, who previously hosted four Tony Awards ceremonies between 2009 and 2013 and two Primetime Emmy Awards telecasts in 2009 and 2013, was chosen as host of the 2015 gala. Meron and Zadan explained their decision to hire the television and theatre star saying, "We are thrilled to have Neil host the Oscars. We have known him his entire adult life, and we have watched him explode as a great performer in feature films, television and stage. To work with him on the Oscars is the perfect storm, all of his resources and talent coming together on a global stage." Harris expressed that it was truly an honor and a thrill to be asked to host Academy Awards commenting, "I grew up watching the Oscars and was always in such awe of some of the greats who hosted the show. To be asked to follow in the footsteps of Johnny Carson, Billy Crystal, Ellen DeGeneres, and everyone else who had the great fortune of hosting is a bucket list dream come true."

Shortly after his selection, several reports were released indicating that DeGeneres and other comedians such as 2005 ceremony host Chris Rock and actress Julia Louis-Dreyfus declined the offer to host the program, and Harris was a last-minute choice as emcee. Nevertheless, both Meron and Zadan denied such allegations and insisted that Harris was their only choice saying, "After every Oscar show there is always a discussion as to who will host the next one. Many names are discussed and sometimes even floated without there being any formal offers. At times, these casual discussions take on a life of their own, and some are eager to break a story without knowing the facts. Neil Patrick Harris received the Academy’s formal offer."

Several other people were also involved with the production of the ceremony. Stephen Oremus served as musical director and conductor for the event. Derek McLane returned to design a new set and stage design for the show. During the ceremony, actor Channing Tatum introduced a group called "Team Oscar", which consisted of six young film students from colleges across the country selected by AMPAS whose role was to deliver Oscar statuettes to the presenters during the gala. Oscar-winning husband-and-wife songwriters Robert Lopez and Kristen Anderson-Lopez composed Harris's opening number entitled "Moving Pictures". Musicians Questlove and Mark Mothersbaugh and actor Will Arnett made cameos during the performance of Best Original Song nominee "Everything Is Awesome".

Box office performance of nominated films

For the first time since 2007, none of the Best Picture nominees had grossed $100 million before the nominations were announced (compared with three from the previous year). The combined gross of the eight Best Picture nominees at the American and Canadian box offices was $205 million, with an average of $25.6 million per film.

None of the eight Best Picture nominees was among the top 50 release in box office during nominations. When the nominations were announced on January 15, 2015, The Grand Budapest Hotel was the highest-grossing film among the Best Picture nominees with $59.1 million in domestic box office receipts. The Imitation Game was the second-highest-grossing film with $42.7 million; this was followed by Birdman or (The Unexpected Virtue of Ignorance) ($26.6 million), The Theory of Everything ($26.2 million), Boyhood ($24.3 million), Selma ($16.5 million), Whiplash ($6.2 million), and finally American Sniper ($3.3 million).

Of the top 50 grossing movies of the year, 23 nominations went to 13 films on the list. Only Big Hero 6 (9th), How to Train Your Dragon 2 (16th), and Into the Woods (25th) were nominated for Best Picture, Best Animated Feature or any of the directing, acting or screenwriting awards. The other top 50 box office hits that earned nominations were Guardians of the Galaxy (1st), Captain America: The Winter Soldier (3rd), The Lego Movie (4th), Maleficent (6th), The Hobbit: The Battle of the Five Armies (7th), X-Men: Days of Future Past (8th), Dawn of the Planet of the Apes (10th), Interstellar (15th), and Unbroken (27th).

Criticism regarding lack of diversity among nominees
Shortly after the nominations were announced, many news media outlets highlighted the lack of racial diversity amongst the nominees in major award categories. According to Tatiana Siegel of The Hollywood Reporter, it was the second time since 1998 that all 20 acting nominees were of Caucasian descent. The New York Times columnist David Carr pointed out the omission of Ava DuVernay and David Oyelowo in directing and lead acting categories. He also noted that these nominations heavily contrasted last year's nominations that included Best Picture winner 12 Years a Slave and Best Supporting Actress winner Lupita Nyong'o.

As a result, the Academy was ridiculed by the Black Twitter community and became the target of hashtag movements such as #OscarsSoWhite and #WhiteOscars. In addition, U.S. Democratic Party Congressman Tony Cárdenas wrote a letter voicing his concerns regarding AMPAS and diversity, stating: “While the issue of diversity in the entertainment industry is a much deeper problem, without an easy solution, it is unfortunate to see such a revered American institution fail to fully reflect our nation.” Cárdenas went on to say that he was willing to work with Academy officials in making the entertainment industry more representative of different ethnicities.

In response to criticism about lack of diversity, AMPAS President Isaacs told reporter Sandy Cohen from the Associated Press that the Academy was "committed to seeking out diversity of voice and opinion." She refrained from addressing the lack of diversity of that year's nominees, although stated that she was proud of all the nominees and praised Selma as a "fantastic motion picture".

Several days before the awards gala, the National Action Network led by civil rights activist Al Sharpton and several other organizations planned to demonstrate near the ceremony at the Dolby Theatre before and during the telecast. However, the protest was canceled in light of DuVernay pleading with black activists to instead pursue a direct dialogue with Academy leadership.

 Critical reception 
The show received a mixed reception from media publications. Some media outlets were more critical of the show. HitFix television columnist Alan Sepinwall commented, "It ran on and on and on and on so much that when host Neil Patrick Harris finally got around to paying off a running gag about his Oscar predictions being locked in a box on stage left, he had to stop to explain the bit to us all over again." In addition, he observed, "Either the production consumed Harris, the writing failed him, or he picked a very strange night to go off-brand." Hal Boedeker of the Orlando Sentinel wrote, "Harris headlined a blah production number to start the show. His running shtick about Oscar predictions grew tiresome." He concluded his review saying, "The music saved this Oscar telecast, but it was still a long, tedious show. The highlight reel will make it look better than it was." Television critic Alessandra Stanley from The New York Times said, "Oscar nights almost always drag on too long, but this one was a slog almost from the very beginning." She also quipped, "The political speeches were somber, but they turned out to be more lively and bracing than any of Harris' skits."

Other media outlets received the broadcast more positively. Television critic Matthew Gilbert of The Boston Globe commented, "Neil Patrick Harris was very Neil Patrick Harrisy Sunday night in his first round as Oscars host. He was calm and cheerful and vanilla as usual, always ready with a lightly snarky joke and always eager to jump into a big production number involving old-timey choreography. He’s a pro at hosting, after his Tony and Emmy gigs, and it showed during the ABC telecast in his endlessly relaxed and open energy." He also wrote despite several production gaffes and an uneven pace, the show moved along "with a minimum of pain." The Times-Picayune columnist Dave Walker wrote, "Harris played it like he was basically born to do it—light on his feet working the crowd or at center stage without his pants, winkingly self-deprecating, moving-right-along when his prepared material didn't land (which was too often)—and he now may have a job for life if he wants it." Furthermore, praised the cast and several musical numbers from the show. David Rooney of The Hollywood Reporter quipped, "Harris displayed winning charm and appealing insouciance, sprinkling the gags with moments of self-deprecation." In addition, he remarked that several of the acceptance speeches and musical numbers provided a mix of humor, fun, and sincerity.

Ratings and reception
The American telecast on ABC drew in an average 37.26 million people over it length, which was a 15% decrease from the previous year's ceremony. An estimated 63 million total viewers watched all or part of the awards. The show also earned lower Nielsen ratings compared to the previous ceremony with 20.6% of households watching over a 33 share. In addition, the program scored a lower 18–49 demo rating with an 11.0 ratings over a 26 share. It was the lowest viewership for an Academy Awards telecast since the 81st ceremony held in 2009.

In July 2015, the ceremony presentation received eight nominations for the 67th Primetime Emmys. The following month, the ceremony won one of those nominations for Outstanding Technical Direction, Camera Work, and Video Control for a Limited Series, Movie, or Special (Technical Directors: Eric Becker, Rick Edwards, John Pritchett, and Rod Wardell; Cameras: Rob Balton, Danny Bonilla, Robert Del Russo, David Eastwood, Suzanne Ebner, Pat Gleason, Ed Horton, Marc Hunter, Jay Kulick, Brian Lataille, Tore Livia, Steve Martyniuk, Lyn Noland, Rob Palmer, David Plakos, Camera, Jofre Romero, Danny Webb, Mark Whitman, and Easter Xua; Video Control: Terrance Ho, Guy Jones, and Keith Winikoff).

In Memoriam
The annual In Memoriam segment was presented by actress Meryl Streep. The montage featured an excerpt of the "Love Theme" from Sophie's Choice by Marvin Hamlisch. At the conclusion of the tribute, singer Jennifer Hudson performed the song "I Can't Let Go" from the television series Smash.

 Mickey Rooney – Actor
 Paul Mazursky – Director, screenwriter
 Geoffrey Holder – Actor
 Nadia Bronson – Marketing executive
 James Garner – Actor
 Elizabeth Peña – Actress
 Alan Hirschfield – Executive
 Edward Herrmann – Actor
 Maya Angelou – Poet
 Lorenzo Semple, Jr. – Screenwriter
 George L. Little – Costume designer
 James Rebhorn – Actor
 Menahem Golan – Producer, director
 James Shigeta – Actor
 Anita Ekberg – Actress
 Paul Apted – Sound editor
 H. R. Giger – Special effects artist
 Sanford E. Reisenbach – Marketing executive
 Malik Bendjelloul – Documentarian
 Virna Lisi – Actress
 Louis Jourdan – Actor
 Gordon Willis – Cinematographer
 Richard Attenborough – Actor, director
 Oswald Morris – Cinematographer
 Tom Rolf – Film editor
 L. M. Kit Carson – Writer, actor
 Ruby Dee – Actress
 Samuel Goldwyn, Jr. – Producer
 Martha Hyer – Actress
 Andrew V. McLaglen – Director
 Jimmy T. Murakami – Animator, director
 Robin Williams – Actor
 William Greaves – Documentarian
 Joseph Viskocil – Special effects artist
 Rod Taylor – Actor
 Stewart Stern – Writer
 Luise Rainer – Actress
 Dick Smith – Makeup artist
 Lauren Bacall – Actress
 Walt Martin – Sound mixer
 Charles Champlin – Film critic
 Pennie Dupont – Casting director
 Herb Jeffries – Actor
 Misty Upham – Actress
 Eli Wallach – Actor
 Gabriel García Márquez – Writer
 Frank Yablans – Studio executive
 Alain Resnais – Director
 Bob Hoskins – Actor
 Mike Nichols – Director

 See also 

 21st Screen Actors Guild Awards
 35th Golden Raspberry Awards
 57th Grammy Awards
 67th Primetime Emmy Awards
 68th British Academy Film Awards
 69th Tony Awards
 72nd Golden Globe Awards
 List of submissions to the 87th Academy Awards for Best Foreign Language Film

 Notes 
A: American Sniper opened in wide release on January 16, where it became the number-one film at the American box office for three consecutive weekends. The film eventually became the highest grossing film at the American and Canadian box office released in 2014.

 References 

 External links 

Official websites
 Academy Awards Official website
 The Academy of Motion Picture Arts and Sciences Official website
 Oscar's Channel at YouTube (run by the Academy of Motion Picture Arts and Sciences)

News resources
 Oscars 2015 BBC News
 Oscars 2015 The Guardian''

Analysis
 2014 Academy Awards Winners and History Filmsite
 Academy Awards, USA: 2015 Internet Movie Database

Other resources
 

Academy Awards ceremonies
2014 film awards
2015 in Los Angeles
2015 controversies in the United States
Mass media-related controversies in the United States
2015 in American cinema
2015 awards in the United States
February 2015 events in the United States
Television shows directed by Hamish Hamilton (director)
African-American-related controversies